Holy Child Auxilium School is a Catholic Minority Institution located in New Delhi. It was established in 1970 and is run by the Salesian sisters. Though meant primarily for Christian girls, Holy Child Auxilium admits children of other communities and religions. The school is an English Medium School recognised by the Delhi Directorate of Education and affiliated with the Central Board of Secondary Education, Delhi.

The senior branch of Holy Child Auxilium is located at Poorvi Marg, Vasant Vihar. The junior branch is located at Sector-12, R. K. Puram.

The school offers instruction from nursery level to Class XII (equivalent to senior secondary in India and high school in the West).

Holy Child Auxilium School is also a convent run by nuns of the Salesian Sisters of Mary Help of Christians. The principal of this school is Sister Celine Alexander. 

The school has celebrated its Ruby Jubilee where the guests of honour were the Archbishop of Delhi and alumna Smriti Z Irani.

Its counterpart, Don Bosco School, is located in the southern part of the city, run by the order of the Salesians of Don Bosco.

Principal
Rev.Sr. Celine Alexander is the current principal of this school.

History 
Saint John Bosco (16 August 1815 – 31 January 1888), born Giovanni Melchiorre Bosco, also called Don Bosco, was an Italian Catholic priest and educator, who put into practice the convictions of his religion, dedicating his life to the uplift in quality of life and education of poor youngsters, making sure to employ teaching methods based on love rather than punishment. His educational system known as preventive system is based on reason, God consciousness and loving kindness.
He also founded, together with Maria Domenica Mazzarello, the Institute of the Daughters of Mary Help of Christians, a religious congregation of nuns dedicated to the care and education of girls, and popularly known as Salesian Sisters. It was founded on 5 August 1872 in Mornese, Alessandria, Italy. Today it has worldwide network of educational institutions in 92 nations. 

The Salesian Fathers arrived in India for the first time on 14 January 1906. The first group of Salesian Sisters arrived in India (Bombay) on 20 November 1922 when the institute was celebrating the golden jubilee of its foundation. The first Salesian Sisters ventured into all types of Educational activities both formal and non-formal, health-care services and social initiatives, giving appropriate responses especially directing their attention to the less privileged and marginalised.

During the 92 years of their presence in India, the Salesian sisters have grown into a gigantic tree, spreading its branches to all parts of India. They now have 6 Provinces and 170 centers and educational institutions.

Chain of School 
At present the Salesian sisters have 85 Provinces in 97 nations within the 5 continents, with a total of over 1500 centers.

Milestones 
Holy Child Auxilium School R.K. Puram Sector XII came into existence on 15.07.1970. It is run by the Salesian Sisters Society of Northern India.

The founders of the school were Sr. Cleofe Fassa, Sr. Luigina Miorelli and Sr. Clara Martin. The school had its beginning with just 24 pupils. It was necessary to shift the primary to another area to start the Senior Secondary School. The Primary school was segregated and transplanted to Vasant Vihar in the year 1983. In the year 1990 the primary school was reallocated to R.K. Puram and the High School was shifted to Vasant Vihar.

Notable alumni
 Smriti Z Irani - Minister of textiles
 Garima Singh, politician

External links
 School website

References

Salesian schools
Catholic schools in India
Christian schools in Delhi
Girls' schools in Delhi
Educational institutions established in 1970
1970 establishments in Delhi